Aaron Cox (born March 13, 1965) is a former American football wide receiver. He played professionally in the National Football League (NFL) for the Los Angeles Rams and the Indianapolis Colts.

Early life
Cox was born in Los Angeles, California and graduated from Susan Miller Dorsey High School. He attended Arizona State University.  He was a highly productive receiver in college, finishing his career with 2,353 yards.

1985: 40 catches for 788 yards with 5 TD.
1986: 35 catches for 695 yards with 2 TD.
1987: 42 catches for 870 yards with 5 TD.

Professional career
Cox was drafted by the Los Angeles Rams in the first round of the 1988 NFL Draft. He played professionally for six seasons. His most productive season was his rookie year, when he caught 28 receptions for 590 yards and five touchdowns. He never lived up to his first-round billing, as one of the draft choices acquired by the Rams, in the trade that sent Cornelius Bennett to the Buffalo Bills.

References

External links
 Pro-Football-Reference.Com
 databaseFootball.com
 NFL Enterprises LLC

1965 births
Living people
Players of American football from Los Angeles
American football wide receivers
Arizona State Sun Devils football players
Los Angeles Rams players
Indianapolis Colts players
Susan Miller Dorsey High School alumni